Skoenmakerskop is a small village in the Eastern Cape, South Africa. It is located southwest of the promontory on which Port Elizabeth stands, 8 km west of Chelsea Point. Skoenmakerskop is Afrikaans for 'shoemaker's hill'. The village, the hill, and the Skoenmakersrivier nearby are all said to have been named after Volcker Schoemaker, a soldier who deserted and settled in the Eastern Province.

References

Populated places in Nelson Mandela Bay